The following low-power television stations broadcast on digital or analog channel 34 in the United States:

 K16IL-D in Kanab, Utah
 K22JJ-D in Milton-Freewater, Oregon
 K24HJ-D in Manti, etc., Utah
 K34AC-D in Yuma, Colorado
 K34AF-D in Alexandria, Minnesota
 K34AG-D in Parowan/Enoch, etc., Utah
 K34AI-D in La Pine, Oregon
 K34BL-D in Lovelock, Nevada
 K34CB-D in Lemhi, etc., Idaho
 K34CM-D in Ely, Nevada
 K34CR-D in Alamogordo, etc., New Mexico
 K34CX-D in Apple Valley, Utah
 K34DC-D in Astoria, Oregon
 K34DI-D in Pendleton, Oregon
 K34DJ-D in Phoenix, etc., Oregon
 K34DN-D in Whitewater, Montana
 K34DP-D in Plevna, Montana
 K34EE-D in Prescott-Cottonwood, Arizona
 K34EU-D in Morongo Valley, California
 K34FO-D in Alton, Utah
 K34FP-D in Valmy, Nevada
 K34FQ-D in Roy, New Mexico
 K34FR-D in Randolph & Woodruff, Utah
 K34FV-D in Duchesne, Utah
 K34GI-D in Trinidad, Colorado
 K34GM-D in Pierre, South Dakota
 K34GO-D in Fillmore, Utah
 K34GY-D in Culbertson, Montana
 K34HE-D in Elko, Nevada
 K34HF-D in Cuba, New Mexico
 K34HO-D in Willmar, Minnesota
 K34HZ in Cody, Wyoming
 K34IB-D in Decatur, Nebraska
 K34IC-D in Glide, Oregon
 K34IN-D in Beaver, Oklahoma
 K34IS-D in Kilauea, Hawaii
 K34IW-D in Hanna, etc., Utah
 K34IY-D in Boulder, Utah
 K34JB-D in Vernal, etc., Utah
 K34JD-D in Manila, etc., Utah
 K34JJ-D in Hollis, Oklahoma
 K34JK-D in Elk City, Oklahoma
 K34JR-D in Madras, Oregon
 K34JX-D in St. James, Minnesota
 K34KE-D in Hood River, Oregon
 K34KJ-D in Crescent City, etc., California
 K34KK-D in Litchfield, California
 K34KL-D in Powers, Oregon
 K34KM-D in Basalt, Colorado
 K34KO-D in Tulia, Texas
 K34KP-D in Clear Creek, Utah
 K34KQ-D in Fountain Green, Utah
 K34KZ-D in Hobbs, New Mexico
 K34LE-D in Shurz, Nevada
 K34LI-D in Jean, Nevada
 K34LJ-D in Kabetogama, Minnesota
 K34LK-D in Beaumont, Texas
 K34LN-D in Cheyenne Wells, Colorado
 K34LS-D in Seneca, Oregon
 K34MC-D in Williams, Minnesota
 K34ME-D in Overton, Nevada
 K34MF-D in Orovada, Nevada
 K34MG-D in Garden Valley, Idaho
 K34MX-D in Odessa, Texas
 K34MZ-D in Prosser, Washington
 K34NA-D in Tampico, Montana
 K34NB-D in Lubbock, Texas
 K34NC-D in Fish Creek, etc., Idaho
 K34ND-D in Moses Lake, Washington
 K34NF-D in Soda Springs, Idaho
 K34NG-D in La Grande, Oregon
 K34NI-D in Florence, Oregon
 K34NL-D in Sargents, Colorado
 K34NM-D in Lamar, Colorado
 K34NN-D in Brewster & Pateros, Washington
 K34NO-D in Grants Pass, Oregon
 K34NP-D in Red Lake, Minnesota
 K34NQ-D in Memphis, Texas
 K34NT-D in Hanksville, Utah
 K34NU-D in Jackson, Minnesota
 K34NV-D in Frost, Minnesota
 K34NW-D in Rural Garfield County, Utah
 K34NY-D in Escalante, Utah
 K34NZ-D in Fremont, Utah
 K34OA-D in Washington, etc., Utah
 K34OB-D in Howard, Montana
 K34OD-D in Tropic, etc., Utah
 K34OF-D in Caineville, Utah
 K34OH-D in Montpelier, Idaho
 K34OI-D in Logan, Utah
 K34OJ-D in Park City, Utah
 K34OK-D in Coalville, Utah
 K34OL-D in Wanship, Utah
 K34OM-D in Henefer, etc., Utah
 K34ON-D in Samak, Utah
 K34OQ-D in Beaver etc., Utah
 K34OS-D in Sterling/South Logan County, Colorado
 K34OT-D in Toquerville & Leeds, Utah
 K34OU-D in Beryl/Modena, etc., Utah
 K34OV-D in Washington, etc., Utah
 K34OW-D in Yreka, California
 K34OX-D in Delta, Oak City, etc., Utah
 K34PA-D in Garrison, etc., Utah
 K34PB-D in Emery, Utah
 K34PC-D in Green River, Utah
 K34PD-D in Spring Glen, Utah
 K34PE-D in Dolan Springs, Arizona
 K34PF-D in Scofield, Utah
 K34PG-D in Payson, Arizona
 K34PH-D in Ferron, Utah
 K34PJ-D in Tillamook, Oregon
 K34PK-D in Tohatchi, New Mexico
 K34PQ-D in Plains, Montana
 K34PT-D in Julesburg, Colorado
 K34PU-D in Crested Butte, Colorado
 K34PV-D in Cortez, Colorado
 K34PW-D in Haxtun, Colorado
 K34PY-D in Mina/Luning, Nevada
 K34QB-D in Vail, Colorado
 K34QC-D in Lewiston, Idaho
 K34QD-D in Bayfield & Ignacio, Colorado
 K34QJ-D in Panaca, Nevada
 K34QL-D in Fallon, Nevada
 K34QX-D in Roundup, Montana
 K34QY-D in Golden Valley, Arizona
 K38JS-D in Antimony, Utah
 K41KX-D in Joplin, Missouri
 K41MZ-D in Livingston, etc., Montana
 K43MD-D in Blanding/Monticello, Utah
 K51AL-D in Olivia, Minnesota
 K51KO-D in Joplin, Montana
 KACA-LD in Modesto, California
 KCBT-LD in Bakersfield, California
 KCDO-TV (DRT) in Sidney, Nebraska
 KCYH-LD in Ardmore, Oklahoma
 KEVA-LD in Boise, Idaho, an ATSC 3.0 station
 KEZT-CD in Sacramento, California
 KHWB-LD in Eugene, Oregon
 KIDV-LD in Albany, Texas
 KMJD-LD in Kalispell, Montana
 KOMI-CD in Woodward, Oklahoma
 KRCR-TV in Redding, California
 KSJF-CD in Poteau, Oklahoma
 KSOY-LD in Mcallen, Texas
 KSPR-LD in Springfield, Missouri
 KSWL-LD in Lake Charles, Louisiana
 KTLP-LD in Pueblo, Colorado
 KTWC-LD in Crockett, Texas
 KUNP-LD in Portland, Oregon
 KVDO-LD in Albany, Oregon
 KVHP-LD in Jasper, Texas
 KVPA-LD in Phoenix, Arizona
 KWRW-LD in Oklahoma City, Oklahoma
 KYDF-LD in Corpus Christi, Texas
 W34DQ-D in Pittsburg, New Hampshire
 W34DV-D in Booneville, Mississippi
 W34DX-D in West Asheville, North Carolina
 W34EP-D in Sapphire Valley, etc., North Carolina
 W34EQ-D in Bangor, Maine
 W34ER-D in Clarksdale, Mississippi
 W34EY-D in Huntsville, Alabama
 W34FB-D in Hamilton, Alabama
 W34FC-D in La Crosse, Wisconsin
 W34FE-D in Parkersburg, West Virginia
 W34FF-D in Panama City, Florida
 W34FH-D in Marion, etc., North Carolina
 W34FK-D in Anasco, Puerto Rico
 W34FL-D in Harrisburg/Lancaster, Pennsylvania
 W34FO-D in Augusta, Georgia
 W34FP-D in Eastlake, Ohio
 W34FR-D in Ithaca, New York
 W34FW-D in Jasper, Florida
 W34FX-D in Montrose, Georgia
 WACN-LD in Raleigh, North Carolina
 WBGS-LD in Bowling Green, Kentucky
 WBXJ-CD in Jacksonville, Florida
 WDNP-LD in St. Petersburg, Florida
 WFBI-LD in South East Memphis, Tennessee
 WHSV-TV (DRT) in Massanutten, Virginia
 WIDO-LD in Wilmington, North Carolina
 WIPX-LD in Indianapolis, Indiana
 WIVM-LD in Canton, Ohio
 WJHJ-LD in Newport News, etc., Virginia
 WJNK-LD in Nashville, Tennessee
 WOOD-TV in Grand Rapids, Michigan
 WPEM-LD in Lumberton, North Carolina
 WPXI (DRT) in New Castle, Pennsylvania
 WRJT-LD in Wausau, Wisconsin
 WSJZ-LD in Salisbury, Maryland
 WWKQ-LD in Quebradillas, Puerto Rico
 WXVK-LD in Columbus, Georgia
 WYBE-CD in Pinehurst, North Carolina
 WYJJ-LD in Jackson, Tennessee
 WZDC-CD in Washington, D.C., uses WRC-TV's full-power spectrum
 WZTD-LD in Richmond, Virginia

The following low-power stations, which are no longer licensed, formerly broadcast on digital or analog channel 34:
 K34BW in Willow Creek, California
 K34EF-D in Kingman, Arizona
 K34EJ in Fairbanks, Alaska
 K34EM in Wenatchee, Washington
 K34FI-D in Bozeman, Montana
 K34FU in Arrey & Derry, New Mexico
 K34GL in Santa Rosa, New Mexico
 K34GU in Fort Sumner, New Mexico
 K34HC in Hilo, Hawaii
 K34HW in Mason, Texas
 K34IF-D in Wallowa, Oregon
 K34II in Butte, Montana
 K34IV-D in Fruitland, Utah
 K34JA-D in Richfield, etc., Utah
 K34KX-D in Rolla, Missouri
 K34KY-D in Mountain Home, Idaho
 K34LC-D in Rifle, etc., Colorado
 K34LR-D in Salinas, California
 K34OG-D in Little America, etc., Wyoming
 K34PO-D in Billings, Montana
 K34QA-D in Klamath Falls, Oregon
 KADY-LP in Sherman, Texas
 KAEU-LP in Alice, Texas
 KFNM-LD in Farmington, New Mexico
 KJCX-LD in Helena, Montana
 KMZM-LD in Cedar Falls, Iowa
 KQLD-LD in Lincoln, Nebraska
 KZFB-LP in Pampa, Texas
 W34CQ in Myrtle Beach, South Carolina
 W34DB in Lewisburg, Tennessee
 W34ED-D in Trujillo Alto, Puerto Rico
 W34EH-D in Champaign, Illinois
 W34FV-D in Soperton, Georgia
 WBQZ-LP in Watertown, New York
 WBTL-LP in Toledo, Ohio
 WJWM-LP in Christiansted, U.S. Virgin Islands

References

34 low-power